After Operation Enduring Freedom in which the Taliban government was toppled in Afghanistan, in December 2001, the German city of Bonn hosted a conference – widely known as the Bonn Conference – of Afghan leaders at Hotel Petersberg, to choose the leader of an Afghan Interim Authority and establish an initial political agreement for reorganising the governmental institutions of Afghanistan.
The Conference chose Hamid Karzai, who was subsequently elected President in 2004.
Karzai subsequently appointed many anti-Taliban allies and regional leaders to senior posts within the interim government and to senior posts in the Provincial governments. The Conference set up the Bonn Agreement for institutional reorganisation.

Substance 
The Conference brought together many adversaries with a common enemy: the Taliban. The US, Russia, and Iran, fervent enemies, all sat down together and cooperated against the Taliban. So too did rivals India and Pakistan. Also included were representatives of the Northern Alliance (the main Taliban adversary within Afghanistan), and various Afghan ethnic and interest groups. Not included were the Taliban themselves, which seemed like an obvious choice at the time since they appeared defeated, but in hindsight their absence may have greatly prolonged the Afghan conflict. The Conference was organized by US Secretary of State Colin Powell at the behest of President George W. Bush.

The conference was borne out of necessity: with the Taliban toppled, there was no obvious government in Afghanistan. The country risked sliding back into the anarchical warlord period of the Afghan Civil War (1992–1996), which had seen widespread atrocities and given rise to the Taliban. The Conference determined that an interim government would rule for 6 months, followed by a loya jirga (grand assembly) which would create an 18 month transitional government. The transitional government's job would be to create a constitution and organize elections for a permanent government. Who would lead the interim government was the thorniest question. King Mohammed Zahir Shah, in exile in Italy since 1973, had good support but he lacked practical experience in fighting mujahedeen style and was now an elderly 87. Burhanuddin Rabbani, leader of the Jamiat-e Islami, was nominally the current president but needed the backing of the Conference if he was to stay in power any longer. Into the fray came Hamid Karzai.

Karzai was a charismatic Pashtun who had gained notice after staging a revolution against the Taliban in the south. He was well liked by the US CIA, who had already had their eyes on him as a potential leader. Pakistan preferred Karzai over the old King, who would have been more anti-Pakistan. A deal was proposed that the King would have a ceremonial role but Karzai would take the lead. Eventually the King himself turned down the idea that he should have a hand in a government, suggesting that Karzai was like a son to him and should lead. This did not sit well with the supporters of Rabbani, but skillful diplomatic maneuvering by Russia, Iran, and the US negotiator James Dobbins gave Karzai the role over Rabbani. In exchange, ethnic Tajiks from the Northern Alliance won half of the cabinet seats. Karzai was informed of his elevation to the presidency on 5 December 2001, only minutes after a US air strike mistakenly targeted him; he had escaped with minor injuries, but 13 others including top advisors were killed. Karzai now had the difficult task of unifying the country after 23 years of constant wara war that was still not over.

Signatories to the Bonn Conference

See also
 Bonn Agreement (Afghanistan)
 List of international conferences on Afghanistan
 Politics of Afghanistan
 International Conference on Afghanistan, Bonn (2011)

External links
The Guardian: The new Afghan administration

References

Diplomatic conferences in Germany
Islamic State of Afghanistan
2001 in Afghanistan
2001 in international relations
21st-century diplomatic conferences (Afghanistan)
History of Afghanistan (1992–present)
Political history of Afghanistan
December 2001 events in Europe
History of Bonn
Petersberg (Siebengebirge)
21st century in Bonn